Tony Brooks-James (born December 6, 1994) is an American football running back who is currently a free agent. He played college football at the University of Oregon.

College career
Brooks-James played four seasons for the Oregon Ducks. He finished his collegiate career with 3,302 all-purpose yards (1,863 rushing, 392 receiving and 1,047 on kick returns) and 21 total touchdowns (18 rushing, two receiving and one kick return).

Professional career

Atlanta Falcons
Brooks-James was brought in for a rookie mini camp invite, he impressed and signed with the Atlanta Falcons as an undrafted free agent on May 11, 2019. He was waived at the end of training camp.

Tampa Bay Buccaneers
Brooks-James was signed to the practice squad of the Tampa Bay Buccaneers of September 2, 2019. He was waived on October 8, 2019.

Pittsburgh Steelers

Brooks-James was signed to the Pittsburgh Steelers practice squad on October 15, 2019. He was promoted to the active roster on November 2 and made his NFL debut the next day. He was released on November 16.

Minnesota Vikings
Brooks-James was signed to the Minnesota Vikings practice squad on December 11, 2019. He signed a reserve/future contract with the Vikings on January 12, 2020. He was waived on August 8, 2020, but re-signed a week later. He was waived on September 2, 2020.

Atlanta Falcons (second stint)
On November 23, 2020, Brooks-James was signed to the Atlanta Falcons practice squad. He was elevated to the active roster on November 28 for the team's week 12 game against the Las Vegas Raiders, and reverted to the practice squad after the game. He signed a reserve/future contract on January 4, 2021. He was released on July 26, 2021.

Pittsburgh Steelers (second stint)
On August 3, 2021, Brooks-James was signed by the Pittsburgh Steelers. He was waived on August 28, 2021.

Birmingham Stallions
Brooks-James was selected in the 27th round of the 2022 USFL Draft by the Birmingham Stallions. On March 8, 2023, Brooks-James was released by the Stallions.

References

External links

Minnesota Vikings bio
Pittsburgh Steelers bio
Oregon Ducks bio

1994 births
Living people
Atlanta Falcons players
American football running backs
Minnesota Vikings players
Oregon Ducks football players
Oregon Ducks men's track and field athletes
Pittsburgh Steelers players
Players of American football from Gainesville, Florida
Tampa Bay Buccaneers players
Birmingham Stallions (2022) players